Samuel Griswold (December 27, 1790 in Burlington, Connecticut – September 14, 1867 in Clinton, Georgia) was an American industrial pioneer in the 1820s based in central Georgia. He was the founder of Griswoldville village, an industrial site. His father was Jeremiah  Griswold (1745-1813) and his mother was Phoebe Case (1751-1798).

Early life
Samuel Griswold was born on December 27, 1790, in Burlington, Connecticut, a member of the prominent Connecticut Griswold family. He moved to Clinton, Georgia, near present-day Gray, with his parents in 1818.

Career
In Georgia, he created a successful cotton gin factory, in 1830, that quickly became the largest producer of cotton gins in the nation. One of his colleagues was Daniel Pratt, who later moved to Alabama and became an important industrial figure and the founder of Prattville, Alabama. Griswold's village, Griswoldville, was an industrial site/company town with a cotton gin plant, soap and tallow factory, candle factory, saw and grist mill, post office and non-denominational church.

At the outbreak of the American Civil War, the Griswold cotton gin factory was leased to the Confederate government and retooled to make pistols and munitions at the behest of Georgia governor Joseph E. Brown.  Griswoldville also served as a mustering site for Confederate and state troops. The revolver produced at Griswoldville was called the Griswold and Grier Revolver, and later on called the Griswold Gunnison, after Arvin Nye Gunnison, Griswold's business partner. The Griswold Gunnison revolvers are copies of the Colt 1851 Navy revolver and were made with distinctive brass frames because of the shortage of steel in the South. Also typical of the Griswold is a cylinder manufactured from twisted iron instead of steel. However, Griswoldville was destroyed on November 20, 1864, by Captain Frederick S. Ladd and his men of the 9th Michigan Volunteer Cavalry Regiment. The Battle of Griswoldville was the first battle of Sherman's March to the Sea.

After the Civil War, he sold a portion of his property and retired.

Death
He died in September 1867 and is buried in the Clinton Cemetery.

In popular culture
Cullen Bohannon, the Confederate Army veteran and protagonist of AMC's Hell on Wheels, carries a Griswold revolver. That fact is established in the pilot episode and is a plot point in multiple episodes (e.g., season 3, episode 6), in which the distinctive gun is used, shown, or mentioned.

References

 Bragg, William H., Griswoldville
 Williams, Carolyn, History of Jones County Georgia: For One Hundred Years, Specifically 1807–1907

External links
 
 Samuel Griswold
 Griswoldville
 

1790 births
1867 deaths
American Civil War industrialists
People of Georgia (U.S. state) in the American Civil War
American people of English descent
People from Burlington, Connecticut
People from Gray, Georgia
Businesspeople from Connecticut
Businesspeople from Georgia (U.S. state)
American city founders
Griswold family